Rättvik Municipality (Rättviks kommun) is a municipality in Dalarna County in central Sweden. Its seat is located in the town of Rättvik.

In 1963 the municipality was reunited with Boda, which had been detached from it in 1875, and in 1974 Ore was added, thus forming the present municipality.

Geography 
Rättvik municipality is situated in the middle of Sweden in the province of Dalarna, in between the three Swedish cities Borlänge, Falun and Mora.

It is located in a traditional forest and agriculture environment, which is how most of Sweden looked in the 19th century and earlier. Nowadays, its culture also attracts a significant number of tourists.

The area near Rättvik municipality has the highest population of brown bears in Sweden.

Town

The contiguous urban area, or locality of Rättvik lies on Lake Siljan, and  had 4,588 inhabitants in 2005; it is widely known for  its old tradition of folkmusic and the beauty of the surroundings close to  Lake Siljan; it is included on many tours of Sweden as an example of a traditional Swedish and Scandinavian way of living.

Its culture and landscape are by some regarded as being genuinely Swedish as it gets. For instance, Rättvik still has its picturesque old church located by the water, where it is surrounded by old "church stables" where the church visitors used to leave their horses.

Every year the folk music festival "Music at Siljan" is held in Rättvik, by the shores of Siljan.

The annual summer opera festival, the Dalhalla Opera, takes place 7 km north of the town in an open-air theatre located in a former limestone quarry.

The bandy club IFK Rättvik has an indoor arena.

Riksdag elections

Resources
Nationalencyklopedin

External links

Rättvik Municipality – Official site
Dalecarlia Horses - The Original
Dalhalla Opera - Official site

Municipalities of Dalarna County